Knufia is a genus of fungi in the family Trichomeriaceae.

The genus was circumscribed by Leonard Hutchison and Wendy Untereiner in 1996, with Knufia cryptophialidica assigned as the type species.

Species
, Species Fungorum (in the Catalogue of Life) accepts 13 species of Knufia, although this number does not include some species described in 2020 and 2021.
 Knufia aspidioti  
 Knufia calcicola 
 Knufia chersonesos 
 Knufia cryptophialidica 
 Knufia endospora 
 Knufia epidermidis 
 Knufia karalitana 
 Knufia marmoricola 
 Knufia mediterranea 
 Knufia peltigerae 
 Knufia perfecta 
 Knufia perforans 
 Knufia petricola 
 Knufia separata 
 Knufia tsunedae 
 Knufia walvisbayicola

References

Eurotiomycetes
Ascomycota genera
Taxa described in 1996